Gerry Gimelstob (March 3, 1951 – March 18, 2017) was an American basketball head coach at the George Washington University from 1981 to 1985. Gimelstob came to George Washington from Indiana University Bloomington, where he was an assistant under Bob Knight.  In his four seasons with the Colonials, Gimelstob compiled a 58–55 overall record, and coached NBA draftee Mike Brown. His best season was 1983–84, when the Colonials were 17–12. He was succeeded by John Kuester.

Gimelstob was an alumnus of the University of Rhode Island.  He died of leukemia on March 18, 2017.

References

1951 births
2017 deaths
American men's basketball coaches
American men's basketball players
Basketball coaches from New Jersey
Basketball players from Newark, New Jersey
Deaths from leukemia
George Washington Colonials men's basketball coaches
Indiana Hoosiers men's basketball coaches
Rhode Island Rams men's basketball players